Richard Evelyn Vernon (7 March 1925 – 4 December 1997) was a British actor. He appeared in many feature films and television programmes, often in aristocratic or supercilious roles. Prematurely balding and greying, Vernon settled into playing archetypal middle-aged lords and military types while still in his 30s. He is perhaps best known for originating the role of Slartibartfast in The Hitchhiker's Guide to the Galaxy. Other notable roles included Edwin Oldenshaw in The Man in Room 17 (1965–67), Sir James Greenley, alias "C" in The Sandbaggers (1978–80) and Sir Desmond Glazebrook in Yes Minister (1980–81) and its sequel series Yes, Prime Minister (1987).

Early life 
Vernon was born in Kenya in 1925 to British parents. Vernon and his parents moved to Britain in 1937 where Vernon attended Reading School and Leighton Park School (both in Reading, Berkshire). During the Second World War served in the Royal Navy. He trained as an actor at the Central School of Speech and Drama.

Career 
In 1960, Vernon appeared in an adaptation of A.J. Cronin's novel, The Citadel. In 1961, he played the father in the BBC series, Stranger on the Shore. An early leading role was as wartime agent-turned-criminologist Edwin Oldenshaw in the TV series The Man in Room 17 (1965–66) and its sequel The Fellows (1967). He also played a small role as Colonel Smithers, an executive of the Bank of England, in a scene opposite Sean Connery and Bernard Lee in the 1964 James Bond film Goldfinger, discussing how Auric Goldfinger transports his gold overseas.

He played an unnamed 'city gent' reluctantly sharing a train compartment with the Beatles in A Hard Day's Night, planet designer Slartibartfast in the BBC radio and TV series The Hitchhiker's Guide to the Galaxy, the occasional character Sir Desmond Glazebrook in the TV series Yes Minister and Yes, Prime Minister, and Mr Becket in Sammy's Super T-Shirt. He also appeared in the 1965 Morecambe and Wise film The Intelligence Men as patron of the arts Sir Edward Seabrook, Lord Bartelsham in Ripping Yarns, and Squire Dale in the BBC Radio 4 adaptation of The Small House at Allington. He played Admiral Croft in the 1971 BBC television adaptation of Persuasion. He played the urbane head of the Secret Intelligence Service Sir James Greenley in ITV political drama The Sandbaggers from 1978 to 1980. In 1986 he appeared in Paradise Postponed, and voiced the professor Gus in The Giddy Game Show (1985-7), in addition to a cameo role (as Professor Jerry Coe) in the video for Experiment IV by Kate Bush. He also appeared in the final episode of Thames Television's production of Rumpole of the Bailey (1992) as Rumpole's exculpatory dentist, Lionel Leering, and in the last series of Lovejoy (1994) playing Tinker's brother-in-law.

On radio, in 1978 he played Sir Gerald Tarrant in a BBC World Service adaptation of the Modesty Blaise book Last Day in Limbo and Professor Misty in the BBC Radio 3 sitcom Patterson in 1981. He also starred in the title role of Lord Emsworth in several BBC Radio 4 series of Blandings between 1985 and 1992.

In December 1990 he began teaching a course on stage acting in Harare, Zimbabwe. He moved back to England in January 1992.

His final film appearance was a cameo at the end of the family film Loch Ness, which was released in 1996.

Personal life and death 
In 1955 he married actress Benedicta Leigh née Hoskyns. They had a daughter Sarah (1956) and a son, Thomas (1958). They divorced in 1990.

Vernon died of complications from Parkinson's disease on 4 December 1997.

Filmography

Film

 Stop Press Girl (1949) - (uncredited)
 Indiscreet (1958) - Guide (uncredited)
 The Heart of a Man (1959) - Manager (uncredited)
 The Siege of Pinchgut (1959) - Under-Secretary
 Sapphire (1960) - Detective
 Clue of the Twisted Candle (1960) - Viney
 Village of the Damned (1960) - Sir Edgar Hargraves
 Foxhole in Cairo (1960) - General
 Cash on Demand (1961) - Pearson 
 The Edgar Wallace Mysteries Film series (1962, The Share Out) - John Crewe
 Reach for Glory (1962) - Dr. Aldrich
 Jigsaw (1962) - (voice)
 We Joined the Navy (1962) - (uncredited)
 The Edgar Wallace Mysteries Film series (1963, Accidental Death) - John Paxton
 Just for Fun (1963) - Prime Minister
 The Servant (1963) - Lord Mounset
 Hot Enough for June (1964) - Roddinghead
 A Hard Day's Night (1964) - Pompous man on train (Johnson)
 Goldfinger (1964) - Colonel Smithers
 The Counterfeit Constable (1964) (French title: Allez France!) - Lord Brisburn
 The Tomb of Ligeia (1964) - Dr. Vivian
 The Yellow Rolls-Royce (1965) - Racecourse official (uncredited)
 The Intelligence Men (1965) - Sir Edward Seabrook
 The Secret of My Success (1965) - Lord Hetherby 
 The Early Bird (1965) - Sir Roger Wedgewood 
 Goodbye, Mr. Chips (1969) - Chairman (uncredited)
 Song of Norway (1970) - Councilman
 She'll Follow You Anywhere (1971) - Andrew Coombes
 One Brief Summer (1971) - Hayward
 The Satanic Rites of Dracula (1973) - Mathews
 Adventures of a Taxi Driver (1976) - Gentleman (uncredited)
 The Pink Panther Strikes Again (1976) - Professor Hugo Fassbender
 Sammy's Super T-Shirt (1978) - Mr. Becket
 The Human Factor (1979) - Sir John Hargreaves
 Oh! Heavenly Dog (1980) - Quimby Charles
 The Box (1981) - (voice)
 Evil Under the Sun (1982) - Flewitt
 Witness for the Prosecution (1982) - Brogan-Moore, barrister
 Gandhi (1982) - Sir Edward Albert Gait
 Night Train to Murder (1983) - Uncle Felix
 Lady Jane (1986) - The Marquess of Winchester
 A Month in the Country (1987) - Colonel Hebron
 Loch Ness (1996) - Aged professor (cameo) (final film role)

Television

 ITV Television Playhouse (1956–1963, 5 episodes) as Multiple roles
 ITV Play of the Week (1957–1966, 9 episodes) as Multiple roles
Probation Officer (1959–1960, 5 episodes) as Doctor Lessing
 No Hiding Place (1959–1961, 2 episodes) as John Eldin/Charles Lacey
 Dixon of Dock Green (1960–1962, 2 episodes) as Fellowes/Pascoe
 Emergency Ward 10 (1960, 1 episode) as Forrester
 Francis Storm Investigates (1960, 1 episode) as Commodore Garwood
 Deadline Midnight (1960, 1 episode) as Holroyd
 Boyd Q.C. (1960, 1 episode) as Mr. Trottman
 Theatre 70 (1960, 1 episode) as Mr. Pearson
 The Odd Man (1960, 5 episodes) as  Charles Ormiston
 The Citadel (1960, 5 episodes) as Doctor Ivory
 Jango (1961, 1 episode) as Parkinson
 Stranger on the Shore (1961, 6 episodes) as David Gough
 Stranger in the City (1962, 6 episodes) as David Gough
 The Cheaters (1962, 1 episode) as  Ken Northwood
 Saki (1962, 8 episodes) as The Major
 Maigret (1962, 1 episode) as Philippe
 The Last Man Out (1962, 1 episode) as The Colonel
 The Avengers (1962, 1 episode) as Lord Matterley
 Harpers West One (1962, 1 episode) as Arthur Purvis
 Z Cars (1962, 1 episode) as Det. Chief Insp. Humphries
 It Happened Like This (1963, 1 episode) as Harker
 24-Hour Call (1963, 1 episode) as Wing Commander Battenby
 Walter and Connie (1963, 1 episode) as Mr. Johns
 The Saint (1963, 1 episode) as Sir John Ripwell
 The Plane Makers (1963, 2 episodes) as Keith Saville
 Crane (1964, 1 episode) as Wolsey
 The Hidden Truth (1964, 1 episode) as William Anstruthe
 Here's Harry (1964, 1 episode) as Self
 The Marriage Lines (1964, 1 episode) as Mr. Renfrew-Smith
 The Man in Room 17 (1965–1966, 26 episodes) as Edwin Oldenshaw
 The Fellows (1967, 13 episodes) as Edwin Oldenshaw
 ITV Playhouse (1967–1970, 3 episodes) as Multiple roles
 Comedy Playhouse (1968, 1 episode) as  Sir Reginald Polk-Mowbray
 Mystery and Imagination (1968, 1 episode) as Professor Krempe
 Harry Worth (1968, 1 episode) as Mr. Gilmore
 The Man in Room 17 (1968–1972, 3 episodes) as Multiple roles
 Thirty-Minute Theatre (1968, 1 episode) as Colonel O'Dwyer
 Journey to the Unknown (1969, 1 episode) as  Sir Gerald Walters
 Department S (1969, 1 episode) as Colonel Loring
 W. Somerset Maugham (1969, 1 episode) as  Lord Kastellan
 Fraud Squad (1970, 1 episode) as  Sir Roy Prentiss
 Biography (1970, 1 episode) as  Tycho Brahe
 UFO (1971, 1 episode) as Stone
 Seasons of the Year (1971, 1 episode) as  Lord Rudge
 Paul Temple (1971, 1 episode) as Carlton
 The Mind of Mr. J.G. Reeder (1971, 1 episode) as Major Olbude
 Brett (1971, 1 episode) as Sutherland
 Albert and Victoria (1971, 1 episode) as Mr. Ridley
 The Persuaders! (1971, 1 episode) as  Sir Maxwell Dean
 The Guardians (1971, 1 episode) as Face
 Hadleigh (1971–1976, 3 episodes) as Sir Geoffrey Osborne
 Persuasion (1971, 5 episodes) as Admiral Croft 
 The Adventurer (1972, 1 episode) as Sir Richard McKenzie
 Softly, Softly: Taskforce (1972, 1 episode) as Sir Ralph Townley
 The Sextet (1972, 8 episodes) as Multiple roles
 Man at the Top (1972, 2 episodes) as  Lord Belmont
 Between the Wars (1973, 1 episode) as Morton
 Late Night Theatre (1973, 1 episode) as Morry Sheldon
 Special Branch (1973, 1 episode) as Townsend
 Upstairs, Downstairs (1973, 2 episodes) as Major Cochrane-Danby
 Harriet's Back in Town (1973, 6 episodes) as Oliver Warburton
 Dolly (1973, 2 episodes) as Mr. Hilary Musgrave
 Dial M for Murder (1974, 1 episode) as The Chief
 Justice (1974, 1 episode) as Lord Tilling
 Thriller (1974, 1 episode) as George Cornfield
 Village Hall (1974, 1 episode) as  Cedric Wellbeloved
 Affairs of the Heart (1974, 1 episode) as Colonel Chart
 Edward the Seventh (1975, 3 episodes) as Lord Salisbury
 Dawson's Weekly (1975, 1 episode) as Solicitor
 The Duchess of Duke Street (1976–1977, 18 episodes) as Major Smith-Barton
 Ripping Yarns (1976, 1 episode) as Lord Bartlesham
 The Cedar Tree (1977, 2 episodes) as Lord Evelyn Forbes
 Do You Remember? (1978, 1 episode) as Lord Greenham
 The Sandbaggers (1978–1980, 12 episodes) as Sir James Greenley / "C"
 Yes Minister  (1980–1981, 2 episodes) as Sir Desmond Glazebrook
 Bognor (1981, 6 episodes) as  Lord Wharfedale
 Roger Doesn't Live Here Anymore (1981, 1 episode) as Judge
 The Hitchhiker's Guide to the Galaxy (1981, 2 episodes) as Slartibartfast
 Legacy of Murder (1982, 6 episodes) as  Roland Tolhurst
 L for Lester (1982, 5 episodes) as Mr. Davies
 Something in Disguise (1982, 5 episodes) as Herbert Browne-Lacey
 Strangers (1982, 1 episode) as Sir Geoffrey
 Nanny (1982, 6 episodes) as Duke of Broughton
 The Boy Who Won the Pools (1983, 2 episodes) as Sir Malvern West
 Pig in the Middle (1983, 1 episode) as Lord Gathorne
 Leaving (1984, 6 episodes) as  Mr. Chessington
 Roll Over Beethoven (1985, 13 episodes) as  Oliver Purcell
 Summer Season (1985, 1 episode) as Thompson
 Ladies in Charge (1986, 1 episode) as Lord Brampton
 Lytton's Diary (1986, 1 episode) as Duncan Anderson
 Paradise Postponed (1986, 9 episodes) as Sir Nicholas Fanner
 Chance in a Million (1986, 1 episode) as  Uncle Evelyn
 The Return of the Antelope (1986–1988, 13 episodes) as Mr. Garstanton
 Last of the Summer Wine (1987, 1 episode) as The Vicar
 Yes, Prime Minister (1987, 1 episode) as Sir Desmond Glazebrook
 Hot Metal (1988, 1 episode) as Lord Gilbert
 A Gentleman's Club (1988, 6 episodes) as George
 Casualty (1988, 1 episode) as Dr. Richard Payton
 Helping Henry (1988, 6 episodes) as Cosmic 1
 The Storyteller (1988, 1 episode) as King
 About Face (1989, 1 episode) as Bingham
 KYTV (1992, 1 episode) as Chester Chuckles
 The Camomile Lawn (1992, 2 episodes) as General Peachum
 Rumpole of the Bailey (1992, 1 epsidoe) as Lionel Leering
 Bonjour la Classe (1993, 1 episode) as Sir Lionel
 You Rang, M'Lord? (1993, 1 episode) as The Earl of Swaffham
 The Return of the Borrowers (1993, 3 episodes) as Mr. Pott
 Rides (1993, 1 episode) as Arthur Copthorne
 Frank Stubbs Promotes (1994, 1 episode) as Lord Dunstable
 Lovejoy (1994, 1 episode) as Roger Nettleton
 Class Act (1994–1995, 14 episodes) as  Sir Horace Mainwaring

References

External links 

Obituary, The Independent
Rogues & Vagabonds, daughter Sarah's theatre site

1925 births
1997 deaths
English male stage actors
English male film actors
English male radio actors
English male television actors
People from Reading, Berkshire
Neurological disease deaths in England
Deaths from Parkinson's disease
Male actors from London
Alumni of the Royal Central School of Speech and Drama
Royal Navy personnel of World War II
People educated at Reading School
People educated at Leighton Park School
20th-century English male actors